Phrynobatrachus acutirostris, the Rugegewald River frog, is a species of frogs in the family Phrynobatrachidae.

It is found in Burundi, Democratic Republic of the Congo, and Rwanda.
Its natural habitats are subtropical or tropical moist montane forest and rivers.
It is threatened by habitat loss.

References

acutirostris
Taxa named by Fritz Nieden
Amphibians described in 1912
Taxonomy articles created by Polbot